"Baby I Love You" is a popular song by R&B singer Aretha Franklin. The only single release from her Aretha Arrives album in 1967, the song was a huge hit, peaking at number 4 on the Billboard Hot 100 Singles chart and spending two weeks at number-one on the Hot Rhythm & Blues Singles chart. In the UK, the song rose to number 39 in August 1967, spending four weeks on the chart. It was featured in Martin Scorsese's 1990 film Goodfellas. A live performance appears on the album Aretha in Paris (1968). 

Georgian songwriter Ronnie Shannon, newly arrived in Detroit, met Franklin's husband and manager Ted White by chance at a barbershop. White requested Shannon write some songs specifically for Franklin. Shannon delivered "I Never Loved a Man (The Way I Love You)" and "Baby I Love You"—two tremendous successes.

Billboard described the single as a "driving rocker" that is "brought to life in this electric performance by Miss Franklin."

Chart positions

References

1967 singles
Aretha Franklin songs
Atlantic Records singles
Song recordings produced by Jerry Wexler
Songs written by Ronnie Shannon
1967 songs